Juan Bautista Alberdi Department is a department in Tucumán Province, Argentina. It has a population of 28,206 (2001) and an area of 730 km². The seat of the department is in Juan Bautista Alberdi. The department is named after Juan Bautista Alberdi.

Municipalities and communes
Escaba
Juan Bautista Alberdi
Villa Belgrano

Notes
This article includes content from the Spanish Wikipedia article Departamento Juan Bautista Alberdi.

Departments of Tucumán Province